The 1999 Stroud Council election took place on 6 May 1999 to elect members of Stroud District Council in Gloucestershire, England. One third of the council was up for election and the council stayed under no overall control.

After the election, the composition of the council was
Labour 24
Conservative 17
Liberal Democrat 5
Independent 5
Green 4

Election result
The results saw Labour remain the largest party on the council, but the Conservatives gained 7 seats and no party had a majority.

References

1999 English local elections
1999
1990s in Gloucestershire